All Saints' Church, Harby is a Grade II listed parish church in the Church of England in Harby, Nottinghamshire.

History
The church in Harby was endowed with a chantry chapel by King Edward I in 1294, following the death of Queen Eleanor. However, the chapel was dissolved at the Reformation and the church became a chapel of ease to North Clifton.

By the middle of the 19th century it was in a poor state of repair. John Thomas Lee of London was appointed as the architect for a new building. Construction began in 1874 and it was consecrated on 2 August 1877. The old church was then demolished and some parts re-used in the new building.

In 1963, the shingles on the spire were replaced with Canadian cedar.

In January 2010 work began on renovating the roofs, incorporating insulation, a breathable membrane and all new tiles.

It is part of a group of parishes which includes 
St Bartholomew's Church, Langford
St Giles' Church, Holme
St Cecilia's Church, Girton
St George the Martyr's Church, North & South Clifton
All Saints' Church, Collingham
St John the Baptist's Church, Collingham
St Helena's Church, South Scarle
Holy Trinity Church, Besthorpe
St Helen's Church, Thorney
All Saints' Church, Winthorpe

References

Church of England church buildings in Nottinghamshire
Grade II listed churches in Nottinghamshire